Daily Asas (Urdu: روزنامہ اساس) is one of the largest national Urdu newspapers in Pakistan, printed simultaneously in Rawalpindi, Lahore, Karachi, Faisalabad and Muzaffarabad.  Its chief editor is Sheikh Iftikhar. This Rawalpindi-based newspaper was started on 16 July 1995. It is published in Urdu. Its publisher is the Asas Group of Newspapers.

Daily edition
The Daily Asas consists of 12 pages of news from all over the world, entertainment, sports, politics, current affairs, education, etc.

Internet edition
The Daily Asas also provide a daily internet edition that contains news about Pakistan and the world.

Columnists
Urdu language columnists include Malik Jamshaid Azam, Zameer Nafees, Riaz Ahmed Chaudary, Abdul Qadir Abbasi, Bilal Mukhtar and Hafiz Bashir Ahmed. English language columnists include Barrister Sheikh Danish Iftikhar, Sheikh Abdul Majeed, Muhammad Azam Azeem and M. Tauqeer Hafeez.

External links
 Asas Official Site

Daily newspapers published in Pakistan
Publications established in 1995
Urdu-language newspapers published in Pakistan